Love and... is a 2015 South Korean drama film written and directed by Korean-Chinese filmmaker Zhang Lu and stars Park Hae-il, Ahn Sung-ki, Moon So-ri and Han Ye-ri. Commissioned by Seoul Senior Film Festival's support program, it consists of four parts – "Love," "Film," "Them" and "Love Again" – is a story within a story. It made its premiere as the opening film of the 8th Seoul Senior Film Festival in September 2015.

Cast
 Park Hae-il as 1st lighting technician
 Ahn Sung-ki as Grandfather 
 Moon So-ri as Hospital janitor
 Han Ye-ri as Granddaughter
 Nam Myung-ryul as Elder 
 Baek Hyun-jin as Nurse

References

External links
 
 
 

2015 films
2010s Korean-language films
South Korean drama films
Films directed by Zhang Lu
2010s South Korean films